In mathematics, a real differential one-form ω on a surface is called a harmonic differential if ω and its conjugate one-form, written as ω∗, are both closed.

Explanation 

Consider the case of real one-forms defined on a two dimensional real manifold. Moreover, consider real one-forms that are the real parts of complex differentials. Let , and formally define the conjugate one-form to be .

Motivation 

There is a clear connection with complex analysis. Let us write a complex number z in terms of its real and imaginary parts, say x and y respectively, i.e. . Since , from the point of view of complex analysis, the quotient  tends to a limit as dz tends to 0. In other words, the definition of ω∗ was chosen for its connection with the concept of a derivative (analyticity). Another connection with the complex unit is that  (just as ).

For a given function f, let us write , i.e. , where ∂ denotes the partial derivative. Then . Now d((df)∗) is not always zero, indeed , where .

Cauchy–Riemann equations 

As we have seen above: we call the one-form ω harmonic if both ω and ω∗ are closed.

Notable results 

A harmonic differential (one-form) is precisely the real part of an (analytic) complex differential. Of course an analytic function  is the local derivative of something (namely ∫w(z) dz).
The harmonic differentials ω are (locally) precisely the differentials df of solutions f to Laplace's equation .
If ω is a harmonic differential, so is ω∗.

See also
 De Rham cohomology

References 

Mathematical analysis